"Tell Me Why" is a song written by Gail Davies and Harry Stinson, and recorded by American country music artist Jann Browne.  It was released in November 1989 as the second single and title track from the album Tell Me Why.  The song reached number 18 on the Billboard Hot Country Singles & Tracks chart.

Chart performance

References

1990 singles
Jann Browne songs
Curb Records singles
1990 songs
Songs written by Harry Stinson (musician)
Songs written by Gail Davies